Acalypha tunguraguae is a species of plant in the family Euphorbiaceae. It is endemic to Ecuador.  Its natural habitat is subtropical or tropical moist montane forests.

References

Flora of Ecuador
tunguraguae
Vulnerable plants
Taxonomy articles created by Polbot